Kaz Garas (born 4 March 1940) is a Lithuanian-American retired actor, best known for his starring role in the TV-series Strange Report, and for his numerous portrayals of sheriffs in low-budget thrillers.

Early life
Garas was born in Kaunas, Lithuania, but immigrated to the United States as a child in July 1949. He became a professional actor in the 1960s.

Career 
Kaz Garas began his career with a few minor parts in TV-series, but finally took off after co-starring as 'Hamlyn Gynt' in the Crime/Mystery-series, Strange Report, acting alongside Anthony Quayle and Anneke Wills. 

After the series was cancelled in 1970, Garas played bit parts on other TV-series and films such as Ben, Fast Gun, Hart to Hart, Wonder Woman and Naked Vengeance. He played a sheriff at least 7 times, in films such as Dazzle, Piranha, Humanoids From the Deep and Final Mission. He retired in 2004.

Partial filmography

 The Last Safari (1967) - Casey
 Hawaii Five-O (1968, TV Series) - Johnny Fargo
 Love Is a Funny Thing (1969) - Paul
 Strange Report (1969-1970, TV Series) - Hamlyn Gynt
 The Sheriff (1971, TV Movie) - Harve Gregory
 The City (1971, TV Movie) - Unknown man
 Ben (1972) - Joe Greer
 Wonder Woman (1974, TV Movie) - Steve Trevor
 Last Hours Before Morning (1975, TV Movie) - Ty Randolph
 Half a House (1975) - Artie
 Murder in Peyton Place (1977, TV Movie) - Springer
 Wonder Woman (1979, TV Series) - Lucas
 Massarati and the Brain (1982, TV Movie) - Nick Henry
 Final Mission (1984) - Pinesville County Sheriff
 Naked Vengeance (1985) - Fletch
 The Devastator (1986) - Sheriff
 Cameo by Night (1987, TV Movie) - Red
 Fast Gun (1988) - Harper
 Death Falls (1991) - Sheriff Perrin
 The November Men (1993) - Sergeant Major
 Puppet Master 5: The Final Chapter (1994) - Man #2
 Piranha (1995, TV Movie) - Sheriff Carl
 Dazzle (1995, TV Movie) - Sheriff
 Humanoids From the Deep (1996, TV Movie) - Sheriff Barnes
 Switched at Birth (1999, TV Movie) - Courthouse Reporter
 The Skin Horse (2003) - Lt. Harrison
 Mean Creek (2004) - Detective Wright (final film role)

References

External links

 

1940 births
Living people
American male actors
Actors from Kaunas
Lithuanian emigrants to the United States